Brodiaea terrestris, the dwarf brodiaea, is a species of plant in the genus Brodiaea that is native to California and Oregon.

In California, it is found in coastal ranges from the Oregon border, through the Bay Area, to San Diego, and in the central Sierra Nevada.

There are two subspecies:
Brodiaea terrestris ssp. kernensis (Kern brodiaea) 
Brodiaea terrestris ssp. terrestris (dwarf brodiaea).

References

Further reading

External links
Jepson Manual Treatment
CalPhotos gallery

terrestris
Flora of California
Flora of Oregon
Flora of the Sierra Nevada (United States)
Natural history of the California chaparral and woodlands
Natural history of the California Coast Ranges
Natural history of the Peninsular Ranges
Natural history of the San Francisco Bay Area
Natural history of the Santa Monica Mountains
Natural history of the Transverse Ranges
Plants described in 1859
Flora without expected TNC conservation status